

Lady of Milan

Early consorts
The name wives and consorts of the early Della Torre lords of Milan are not known. But Napoleone della Torre may have been married to a Margherita di Baux.

House of Visconti, 1277–1302

House of della Torre, 1302–1311

House of Visconti, 1311–1395

Duchess of Milan

House of Visconti, 1395–1447 

Ambrosian Republic (1447–1450)

House of Sforza, 1450–1499

House of Valois-Orléans, 1499–1500

House of Sforza, 1500 
None

House of Valois-Orléans, 1500–1512

House of Sforza, 1512–1515 
None

House of Valois-Angoulême, 1515–1521

House of Sforza, 1521–1524 
None

House of Valois-Angoulême, 1524–1525

House of Sforza, 1525–1535

House of Habsburg, 1540–1700

House of Bourbon, 1700–1706

House of Habsburg, 1707–1780

House of Habsburg-Lorraine, 1780–1796 

Transpadane Republic (1796–1797)
Cisalpine Republic (1797–1799)

House of Habsburg-Lorraine, 1799–1800 

Cisalpine Republic (1800–1802)
Italian Republic (1802–1805)
Kingdom of Italy (1805–1814); See Also: List of Italian consorts
Kingdom of Lombardy–Venetia (1815–1859/66); See Also: List of consorts of Lombardy-Venetia

Mistresses of the Dukes of Milan

Sources
MILAN

 
History of Milan
~
~
Milanese, consorts
Consorts of Milan
Consorts